Ideluy-e Olya (also Romanized as Īdelūy-e ‘Olyā; also known as Īgdalū-ye Bālā) is a village in Churs Rural District, in the Central District of Chaypareh County, West Azerbaijan Province, Iran. At the 2006 census, its population was 30, in 7 families.

References 

Populated places in Chaypareh County